The Scuola italiana "Italo Calvino" ("Italo Calvino Italian School") is the only Italian curriculum school in Russia. It has two campuses in Moscow.

Its primary, secondary, and liceo linguistico levels are in one location, the second floor of a campus shared with the Swedish School in Moscow, the Moscow Finnish School, and the Moscow Japanese School. This campus is in Lomonosovsky District, South-Western Administrative Okrug.

The scuola materna is in a separate location.

See also

 Italy–Russia relations

References

External links
  Scuola italiana "Italo Calvino"
  Scuola italiana "Italo Calvino"

Italian international schools in Europe
International schools in Moscow
Italy–Russia relations
Italo Calvino